Kabzaa is a 1988 Indian Hindi-language action crime film, written by Salim Khan and directed by  Mahesh Bhatt starring Raj Babbar, Sanjay Dutt, Paresh Rawal, Amrita Singh and Dimple Kapadia in the lead roles. In the film, Ravin is a young man who works for Veljibhai Soda, a gangster, and does illegal work for him. Once, he is asked to vacate Ali from his property, but he gets inspired by his ideals and decides to change his ways.

The film received positive reviews from the critics but failed to create a big impact at the box office. Over the years it has garnered a cult following. Bhatts reused the same theme in their 1998 film Ghulam starring Aamir Khan and directed by Vikram Bhatt.

Plot
Ravi Verma (Sanjay Dutt), a careless boy, lives with his elder brother Ranjeet Verma (Raj Babbar). Ranjeet is a lawyer and works for Veljibhai Soda (Paresh Rawal), who is a criminal. Veljibhai has an order to forcefully acquire a land which belongs to a freedom fighter Ustad Ali Mohammed (Aloknath). Ali wants to build up a children's park at that site. Ravi somehow gets into the picture and Veljibhai asks him to go there and warn Ali to leave the land immediately. Ravi is suffering from brain tumor and while throwing things out of Ali's house, he falls on the floor. Ali takes him to the hospital. When Ravi gains consciousness, he realises that he had been doing wrong and changes his mind.
He realises his duties and now wants to save Ali's land at any cost from Veljibhai. Veljibhai, on realising this, takes the onus upon himself to capture the land in his own hands. He gets Ali killed in the process. Ali has handed over the ownership of land to Ravi in his deed. Veljibhai asks Ravi to hand over the deed papers in ransom for his brother, Ranjeet. Ranjeet however tries to get the papers back but is killed by Veljibhai. Now Ravi has everything to go against Veljibhai and not let his plans succeed. But Veljibhai is clever enough to kidnap his love Rita (Amrita Singh). Ravi rescues Rita and kills Veljibhai not before he is shot with four bullets, but saves himself by crawling towards phone booth to call ambulance. The ambulance arrives and in the hospital, Ravi is saved, along with the removal of his brain tumor. He gets the children's park built in Ali's land as per his last wish.

Cast
 Raj Babbar as Ranjeet Verma
 Sanjay Dutt as Ravi Verma
 Amrita Singh as Rita
 Dimple Kapadia as Dr. Smita
 Aloknath as Ustad Ali Mohammed
 Paresh Rawal as Veljibhai Soda
 Anupam Kher as Daaga

Soundtrack
The music was composed by Rajesh Roshan and the songs were written by Anand Bakshi.

External links

1988 films
1980s Hindi-language films
Films scored by Rajesh Roshan
Films directed by Mahesh Bhatt